Surdegis is a town in Anykščiai district municipality, in Utena County, in northeast Lithuania. According to the 2011 census, the town had a population of 158 people.

Famous citizens 
Algimantas Masiulis (1931–2008), actor
Arvydas Pajuodis, economist
Algirdas Kratulis, journalist

References

Towns in Utena County
Towns in Lithuania
Vilkomirsky Uyezd
Anykščiai District Municipality